Chorachiwadi is a panchayat village in Maharashtra, India. Administratively, Chorachiwadi is in the Shrigonda taluka of Ahmadnagar District in Maharashtra.

The Grampanchayat of Chorachiwadi is made of two small villages, Chorachiwadi Gavthan and Bhingan Dumala. The former has a larger land area and population than the latter. It is located between the historic Bahadur Gadh (named after Chhatrapati Sambhaji) fort of Pedgaon and the Shrigonda taluka. Bhingan Dumala is situated on the banks of Saraswati, a small river that meets the Bhima River in Pedgaon at a distance of five kilometers.

Agriculture 
Most of the villagers are farmers who harvest various crops such as sugarcane, sorghum (Jowar), wheat, cotton, grapes, lemons, pomegranates, bananas, different nuts such as tree nuts and peanuts, onions, watermelons, and cucumbers.

Due to lack of rain, almost all irrigation depends on water canal systems, locally named Kukadi and Ghod. The Ghod water canal passes through the village, even though most of the land is irrigated by Kukadi canal water.

Education 

Chorachiwadi and its subpart Bhingan each have Anganwadi/Balwadi (kindergartens), a program of Ekatmik Balvikas Kendra Shrigonda tehsil. In addition, in chorachiwadi, there are two more mini-anganwadis for the children's staying on the outskirts of the village like Salunke Wasti, Landge Wasti, etc. The Zilla Parishad runs school up to seventh grade in chorachiwadi and up to fourth grade in Bhingan. A private high school named Pralhad Maharaj High School (2006) for grades eighth to tenth.

Students can also enroll in other high schools of Shrigonda, where they can opt for a convent or semi-English medium school and pursue vocational courses along with their regular courses. Several students from Chorachiwadi are pursuing their engineering degrees from reputed government and non-government engineering colleges all over Maharashtra.

Politics 
As of 2014, the total number of voters was around 1200.

Sports 
The youth of Chorachiwadi plays different sports. Kho kho and Kabaddi have been played since primary school, and students participate in interschool Kho kho and Kabaddi competitions to represent Chorachiwadi. On the day of Sankranti, the youth organizes informal Kabaddi matches in the village.

The Chorachiwadi Cricket team participates in various cricket tournaments all over the district. The youth also started a Chorachiwadi Premier League (CPL) cricket league and organized a cricket tournament in October 2016.

Volleyball gained popularity, and players formed a Yodhha group. The said group participates in other social activities as well.

Female participation in local sports remains low, as it does in most parts of rural India.

References

 2001 Census Village code for Chorachiwadi = 03331100, "2001 Census of India: List of Villages by Tehsil: Maharashtra" (PDF). Registrar General & Census Commissioner, India. p. 647. Archived (PDF) from the original on 13 November 2012.
 Poona India, Sheet NE 43-06 (topographic map, scale 1:250,000), Series U-502, United States Army Map Service, May 1960

Villages in Ahmednagar district